Leucoptera adenocarpella is a moth in the family Lyonetiidae that is endemic to the Iberian Peninsula.

The larvae feed on Adenocarpus decorticans. They mine the leaves of their host plant. The mine consists of a nearly full-depth greenish blotch. The mine is not contracted. The frass is deposited in very fine granules. Pupation takes place outside of the mine.

References

Leucoptera (moth)
Moths described in 1871
Moths of Europe